T'Kout District is a district of Batna Province, Algeria.

Municipalities
The district further divides into three municipalities.
T'Kout
Ghassira
Kimmel

Districts of Batna Province